Bartschia significans is a species of sea snail, a marine gastropod mollusc in the family Colubrariidae.

Description
The shell size varies between 40 mm and 51 mm

Distribution
This species is distributed in the Gulf of Mexico.

References

 Rosenberg, G., F. Moretzsohn, and E. F. García. 2009. Gastropoda (Mollusca) of the Gulf of Mexico, pp. 579–699 in Felder, D.L. and D.K. Camp (eds.), Gulf of Mexico–Origins, Waters, and Biota. Biodiversity. Texas A&M Press, College Station, Texas

External links
 

Colubrariidae
Gastropods described in 1943